Eternal Affairs is the second album released by Heather B. It was released on February 12, 2002 through independent label Sai Records.

Track listing

2002 albums
Albums produced by DJ Premier
Albums produced by Pete Rock